The Skolkovskoye Highway is a highway located in the Mozhaysky District of the Western Administrative Okrug of Moscow and in the Odintsovsky District of Moscow Oblast. In 2012, the highway overtook the famous Rublyovka in terms of the cost of renting a square meter of real estate.

Etymology
The Skolkovskoye Highway is named after the village of Skolkovo near Moscow, to which it leads. It was already shown on plans in the 17th century. the village got its name from the surname Skolkov, known since the 16th century.

References 

Roads in Moscow
Roads in Moscow Oblast